During the 1981–82 English football season, Arsenal F.C. competed in the Football League First Division.

Season summary 

The start of the 1981/82 season was not going swimmingly for Arsenal manager Terry Neill. After losing Liam Brady in the summer of 1980, Frank Stapleton was the next star to leave Highbury, his departure in August 1981 made that much harder when he chose to join Manchester United. Without adequate replacements for their star men, the Arsenal faithful were restless. This season was the first season that Arsenal bore the name of a sponsor on their shirts. The Japan Victor Company, or JVC as they’re better known, had the honour of being Arsenal’s first shirt sponsor.  

A third-place finish during the previous campaign had seen Neill’s men go through the season unbeaten at home. But alarm bells immediately chimed when Stoke left Highbury victorious on the opening day of the 81/82 season. Five defeats in their first twelve League matches indicated that all was not well, and more worryingly the team had scored just eight goals in the process of slumping to 14th place in the table. There was a welcome distraction in the UEFA Cup. Two wins against Panathinaikos, saw the club go through to the next round. And when Belgian part-timers Winterslag were paired with Arsenal in the draw for the second round, it looked as if Neill could at least look forward to another European trip in the last 16 of the competition. But again, Arsenal would pay for their wastefulness in front of goal. Arsenal won the second leg 2-1, but went out on the away goals rule and they were stunned when Winterslag went through. In fairness to Neill, the team did respond well after the Winterslag debacle. Five straight league wins, and just six defeats in the remaining 30 matches saw the club finish fifth in the League.  

On 2 January 1982 Pat Jennings found himself on the treatment table, after a disappointing FA Cup third round exit, 0-1 against Tottenham Hotspur after an error by Jennings, and a groin injury forced him to limp off with 15 minutes to go. Scottish keeper George Wood assumed the No 1 spot until the end of the season.

Squad

Results

First Division

Football League Cup

FA Cup

Arsenal entered the FA Cup in the third round proper, in which they were drawn to face Tottenham Hotspur.

UEFA Cup

Top scorers

First Division
  Alan Sunderland 11
  Graham Rix 9
  Brian Talbot 7

References

External links
 Arsenal 1981–82 on statto.com

Arsenal
Arsenal F.C. seasons